Antonio Coll (born 6 April 1959) is a Spanish former professional racing cyclist. He rode in three editions of the Tour de France and seven editions of the Vuelta a España.

Major results

1980 
 2nd Overall Escalada a Montjuïc
 5th Overall Volta a Catalunya
1981 
 1st  Overall Vuelta a Aragón
 1st Stage 3b Vuelta a los Valles Mineros
 3rd Overall Volta a la Comunitat Valenciana
1st Stage 4a 
 5th Overall Vuelta a España
 7th Overall Vuelta a Andalucía
1982 
 1st Stage 4 Vuelta a España
 1st Stage 2 Tour of the Basque Country
 2nd Overall Vuelta a Cantabria
1st Stage 2 
 2nd Trofeo Masferrer
 6th Road race, National Road Championships
 6th Clásica de San Sebastián
1983 
 Vuelta a Cantabria
1st Stages 4 & 6 
 1st Stage 7a Volta a Catalunya
 1st Prologue Volta a la Comunitat Valenciana
 1st Stage 4 Vuelta a Asturias
 2nd Overall Vuelta a Andalucía
 2nd Clásica de San Sebastián
 2nd Clásica a los Puertos de Guadarrama
 3rd Road race, National Road Championships
 3rd Subida a Arrate
 4th Overall Setmana Catalana de Ciclisme
1984 
 3rd Prueba Villafranca de Ordizia
 8th Overall Volta a Catalunya
 10th Trofeo Masferrer
1985 
 3rd Clásica a los Puertos de Guadarrama
 6th Overall Setmana Catalana de Ciclisme
 6th Subida al Naranco
 10th Clásica de San Sebastián
1987
 5th Overall Vuelta a Murcia

References

External links
 

1959 births
Living people
Spanish male cyclists
Sportspeople from Sabadell
Cyclists from Catalonia
20th-century Spanish people